Vanscoy or van Scoy may refer:

Places
 Rural Municipality of Vanscoy No. 345, Saskatchewan, Canada
 Vanscoy, Saskatchewan, Canada; an urban municipality located within the rural municipality of Vanscoy
 Relief landing field Vanscoy of the RCAF Station Saskatoon, an offsite landing field for relief of the main field; in Vanscoy, Saskatchewan, Canada; formerly WWII British RAF training station RCAF Vanscoy

People
 Grant Van Scoy, baseball player, member of the 2018 Illinois Fighting Illini baseball team
 Jerry VanScoy, football player, member of the 1960 Ohio State Buckeyes football team
 Thomas Van Scoy (1848–1901) U.S. minister and educator
 Tommy Van Scoy (1920–2005) U.S. diamond jeweler
 W.A. Van Scoy, an early film director, see List of American live-action shorts

Other uses
 Van Scoy, a jewelry chain founded by Tommy Van Scoy, and sponsor of the Van Scoy Diamond Mine 500 race
 NASCAR Van Scoy Diamond Mine 500 (Van Scoy 500), NASCAR Cup-series race
 USAC Van Scoy Diamond Mine 500 (Van Scoy 500), former name of the IndyCar race ABC Supply 500

See also

 Vans (disambiguation)
 Coy (disambiguation)
 Van (disambiguation)